The Hipódromo De Los Andes is a horse racing track located in the north of Bogota, Colombia. It has a capacity for 20,000 people for concerts.

Nowadays, it is used only for events. Daddy Yankee and Don Omar are some of the singers that have performed in there. Mana is scheduled to perform in the venue on March 3, 2012.

References
 
 

Sports venues in Colombia
Sports venues in Bogotá